James Drummond may refer to:

Noblemen
James Drummond, 1st Earl of Perth (died 1611), Earl of Perth
James Drummond, 3rd Earl of Perth (c. 1615–1675), Earl of Perth
James Drummond, 4th Earl of Perth (1648–1716), Scottish statesman, and Jacobite
James Drummond, 2nd Duke of Perth (c. 1674–1720), de jure 5th Earl of Perth
James Drummond, 3rd Duke of Perth (1713–1746), de jure 6th Earl of Perth
James Drummond, 3rd Duke of Melfort (1708–1766) de jure 11th Earl of Perth
James Louis Drummond, 4th Duke of Melfort (1750–1800) de jure 12th Earl of Perth
James Eric Drummond, 16th Earl of Perth (1876–1951), British diplomat, first secretary-general of the League of Nations
James Drummond, Viscount Strathallan (born 1965), heir apparent, see Earl of Perth
James Drummond, 1st Baron Perth (1744–1800), Scottish landowner and peer
James Drummond, 5th Viscount Strathallan, de jure Viscount Strathallan (1722–1765)
James Drummond, 6th Viscount Strathallan, de jure Viscount Strathallan (c. 1752–1775)
James Drummond, 8th Viscount Strathallan (1767–1851), Viscount Strathallan
James Drummond, 10th Viscount Strathallan (1839–1893), Viscount Strathallan
James Drummond, 1st Baron Maderty (1540?–1623), Scottish peer

Others
James Drummond (artist) (1816–1877), Scottish artist
James Drummond (Australian politician) (1814–1873), Member of the Western Australian Legislative Council, 1870–1873
James Drummond (bishop) (1629–1695), Bishop of Brechin
James Drummond (botanist) (1786/7–1863), Scottish-born botanist and naturalist, early settler in Western Australia
James Drummond (chaplain) (died 1699), Scottish chaplain
James Lawson Drummond (1783–1853), Irish physician, naturalist and botanist 
James Mackay Drummond (1869–1940), New Zealand journalist, naturalist and writer
James Ramsay Drummond (1851–1921), civil servant in India, and amateur botanist
James Robert Drummond (1812–1895), British naval officer, captain of part of the Mediterranean Fleet during the Crimean War
James S. Drummond (died 1881), mayor of Victoria, British Columbia

See also
Jamie Drummond (born 1971), Canadian sommelier
Jim Drummond (1918–1950), Canadian ice hockey defenceman
Jimmy Drummond (1881–?), Scottish footballer